Victoria Jiménez Kasintseva (born 9 August 2005) is an Andorran tennis player. She won the 2020 Australian Open girls' singles title, defeating Weronika Baszak in the final. It was her junior Grand Slam debut, and she was the youngest player in the draw. She made her WTA Tour main-draw debut at the 2021 Madrid Open as a wildcard, also as the youngest and the first-ever player from Andorra to appear in a WTA tournament main draw, where she lost in the first round to Kiki Bertens. She recorded her first WTA main draw win at the 2022 Korea Open.

Jiménez Kasintseva has won nine singles titles on the ITF Junior Circuit, as well as one doubles title. She achieved a career-high ITF Junior ranking of No. 1, on 9 March 2020.

She began training with her father and coach in 2009, and admires fellow left-handers Rafael Nadal and Petra Kvitová.

Personal life
Jiménez Kasintseva was born in Andorra to an Andorran father, Joan Jiménez Guerra, and a Russian mother, Yulia Kasintseva. Her father is a former tennis professional who reached a career-high ATP Tour ranking of 505. She spent three years of her childhood in Kentucky (United States), and speaks five languages fluently: Spanish, English, Catalan, French and Russian.

Junior career

Grand Slam performance
Singles:
 Australian Open: W (2020)
 French Open: QF (2021)
 Wimbledon: SF (2021)
 US Open: QF (2021)

Doubles:
 Australian Open: 1R (2020)
 French Open: SF (2021)
 Wimbledon: 1R (2021)
 US Open: SF (2021)

Performance timeline
Only main-draw results in WTA Tour, Grand Slam tournaments, Fed Cup/Billie Jean King Cup and Olympic Games are included in win–loss records.

Singles
Current after the 2023 Australian Open.

ITF Circuit finals

Singles: 5 (3 titles, 2 runner-ups)

Doubles: 2 (1 title, 1 runner-up)

Junior Grand Slam finals

Singles: 1 (1 title)

ITF Junior Circuit finals

Singles (9–2)

Doubles (1–2)

Notes

References

External links
 
 

2005 births
Living people
Andorran female tennis players
Andorran people of Russian descent
Andorran people of Spanish descent
Australian Open (tennis) junior champions
Grand Slam (tennis) champions in girls' singles